Einar Mässeli (4 January 1898 – 4 December 1966) was a Finnish cross-country skier who competed in the 1928 Winter Olympics.

He was born in Säkäjärvi, Virolahti and died in Virolahti.

In 1928 he finished 13th in the 18 km competition.

Cross-country skiing results

Olympic Games

External links
 profile

1898 births
1966 deaths
People from Virolahti
People from Viipuri Province (Grand Duchy of Finland)
Finnish male cross-country skiers
Olympic cross-country skiers of Finland
Cross-country skiers at the 1928 Winter Olympics
Sportspeople from Kymenlaakso
20th-century Finnish people